Pleasureville Historic District is a national historic district located at Springettsbury Township in York County, Pennsylvania. The district includes 105 contributing buildings and one contributing site in the crossroad community of Pleasureville. Most of the buildings are residential include 19th century vernacular dwellings with notable examples of early 20th century Colonial Revival and Italianate style dwellings.  Notable non-residential buildings include a former schoolhouse (c. 1870), meeting hall (c. 1875), former store and accessory shop (c. 1860), and small industrial shop (c. 1930). The contributing site is the Pleasureville Cemetery with 72 marked graves dating between 1865 and 1929.

The district was listed on the National Register of Historic Places in 2000.

References 

Colonial Revival architecture in Pennsylvania
Historic districts in York County, Pennsylvania
Italianate architecture in Pennsylvania
Springettsbury Township, York County, Pennsylvania
Historic districts on the National Register of Historic Places in Pennsylvania
National Register of Historic Places in York County, Pennsylvania